Evelyn Schuler (born 17 December 1974) is a Brazilian alpine skier. She competed in two events at the 1992 Winter Olympics.

References

External links
 

1974 births
Living people
Brazilian female alpine skiers
Olympic alpine skiers of Brazil
Alpine skiers at the 1992 Winter Olympics
Place of birth missing (living people)